Gerhard Ritterband (1904–1959) was a German film actor.

Selected filmography
 The Doll (1919)
 The Princess of the Nile (1920)
 Va banque (1920)
 A Day on Mars (1921)
 Four Around a Woman (1921)
 The Dance of Love and Happiness (1921)
 Evelyn's Love Adventures (1921)
 The Moneylender's Daughter (1922)
 Girl of the Berlin Streets (1922)
 Your Valet (1922)
 The Romance of a Poor Sinner (1922)
 Maciste and the Silver King's Daughter (1922)
 Maciste and the Chinese Chest (1923)
 Niniche (1925)
 The Motorist Bride (1925)
 Old Mamsell's Secret (1925)
 The Dice Game of Life (1925)
 The Salesgirl from the Fashion Store (1925)
 Love's Finale (1925)
 The Captain from Koepenick (1926)
 The Circus of Life (1926)
 The Mill at Sanssouci (1926)
 The Bank Crash of Unter den Linden (1926)
 Annemarie and Her Cavalryman (1926)
 Darling, Count the Cash (1926)
 Bigamy (1927)
 Benno Stehkragen (1927)
 Paragraph 182 (1927)
 The Woman with the World Record (1927)
 The Lady from Argentina (1928)
 Ariadne in Hoppegarten (1928)
 Because I Love You (1928)
 Inherited Passions (1929)
 The Girl with the Whip (1929)
 The Ship of Lost Souls (1929)
 Column X (1929)
 Beware of Loose Women (1929)
 End of the Rainbow (1930)
 Under False Flag (1932)
 Wedding at Lake Wolfgang (1933)

References

Bibliography
 Hardt, Ursula. From Caligari to California: Erich Pommer's life in the International Film Wars. Berghahn Books, 1996.

External links

1904 births
1959 deaths
German male film actors
German male silent film actors
20th-century German male actors
Male actors from Berlin